John D. Barge is the former superintendent of schools for the U.S. state of Georgia. He was a candidate for Governor of Georgia in the 2014 election, coming in third place in the Republican primary and receiving 11.5% of the vote.

In 2020, Barge ran for the United States House of Representatives in Georgia's 14th congressional district, but lost in the Republican primary on June 9, 2020.

Barge graduated from Berry College in Rome, Georgia with a bachelor's degree, from the University of West Georgia with master's and specialist's degrees, and from the University of Georgia with a doctorate in educational leadership. He has served as a high school and middle school teacher, assistant principal, and principal, and as the State Director of Career, Technical and Agriculture Education for the Georgia Department of Education. Prior to being elected State School Superintendent, Barge served as the Director of Secondary Curriculum & Instruction with the Bartow County School System.

References

Georgia Department of Education
Barge 2014 campaign site
Project Vote Smart

Georgia Superintendent of Schools
Candidates in the 2020 United States elections
Georgia (U.S. state) Republicans
Living people
University of Georgia alumni
University of West Georgia alumni
Year of birth missing (living people)